Jacqueline Brown (born 6 June 1953) is a British former swimmer. She competed at the 1968 Summer Olympics and the 1972 Summer Olympics.

References

1953 births
Living people
British female swimmers
Olympic swimmers of Great Britain
Swimmers at the 1968 Summer Olympics
Swimmers at the 1972 Summer Olympics
Sportspeople from Kingston upon Hull
20th-century British women